= Evans Park =

- Location within Gauteng Location within South Africa
- Coordinates: 26.244°S 28.002°E
- Country: South Africa
- Province: Gauteng
- Municipality: City of Johannesburg
- Main Place: Johannesburg

Area
  - Total: 0.28 km^{2} (0.11 sq mi)

Population (2011)
  - Total: 589
  - Density: 2,100/km^{2} (5,400/sq mi)

Racial makeup (2011)
  - Black African: 29.7%
  - Coloured: 11.2%
  - Indian/Asian: 48.6%
  - White: 8.8%
  - Other: 1.7%

First languages (2011)
  - English: 63.1%
  - Afrikaans: 11.8%
  - Zulu: 11.0%
  - Sotho: 5.8%
  - Other: 8.3%
- Time zone: UTC+2 (SAST)
- Postal code (street): 2091

Evans Park is a suburb of Johannesburg, South Africa. It is located in Region F of the City of Johannesburg Metropolitan Municipality.
